Euconulus alderi is a species of small air-breathing land snail, a terrestrial pulmonate gastropod mollusk in the family Euconulidae, the hive snails.

Distribution 
This species occurs in countries and islands including:
 Great Britain
 Ireland
 France
 Sweden
 the USA

References

 In Michigan: 
 USDA Forest Service info: 
 Reinhardt, O. (1883). Über die von den Herren Gebrüder Krause auf ihrer Reise gesammelten Pupa-, Hyalina- und Vallonia-Arten. Sitzungs-Berichte der Gesellschaft Naturforschender Freunde zu Berlin, 1883: 37-43. Berlin.
 nvertEBase. (2018). Authority files of U.S. and Canadian land and freshwater mollusks developed for the InvertEBase (InvertEBase.org) project.

External links
Euconulus alderi at Animalbase taxonomy,short description, distribution, biology,status (threats), images
 Gray J.E. (1840). A manual of the land and freshwater shells of the British Islands by W. Turton. A new edition. Longman, Orme, Brown, Green and Longmans, London. i-ix, 1-324, plates 1-12
 Horsáková, V., Nekola, J. C. & Horsák, M. (2020). Integrative taxonomic consideration of the Holarctic Euconulus fulvus group of land snails (Gastropoda, Stylommatophora). Systematics and Biodiversity. 1-19.

Euconulidae
Gastropods described in 1979